In the United States and Canada, Certified Funds are a form of payment that is guaranteed to clear or settle by the company certifying the funds.

When making certain types of transactions, such as purchasing real property, motor vehicles and other items that require title, the seller usually requires a guarantee that the payment method used will satisfy the obligations. To do this, the seller will require certified funds, usually in the form of:

Certified check
cashier's check (known as a bank draft in Canada)
money order (usually with proper identification)
manager's check (usually with proper identification)
EFT wire transfer  (i.e. Western Union)

Specifically, personal checks are not allowed, as the account may not have sufficient funds, and credit cards are not allowed, as the transaction may later be disputed or reversed.

Checks sent by a bank bill payment service where funds are removed from the sender's account before the check is sent are in an ambiguous category, since the recipient may not be notified that the funds are certified. An example is Chase Billpay service.

Sometimes steps may be taken to ensure that certified funds cannot easily be forged. These steps can include various unique stamps, inks and hole punchers, as well as the assistance of a machine such as a protectograph. Unfortunately, these steps cannot prevent someone from erasing the payee's name and writing in their own name. Fraud is specifically not reimbursed by many issuers of money orders (e.g. Western Union), and so has to go through local police. The perpetrator can then claim "identity theft" to the investigating detective. Such money orders can be obtained from places like rent-drop boxes.

References 
Payment systems